The 2015 FFA Cup was the second season of the FFA Cup, the main national soccer knockout cup competition in Australia. 32 teams began competition in the competition proper (from the round of 32), including all 10 A-League teams, the reigning National Premier Leagues Champion (North Eastern MetroStars from South Australia), and 21 Football Federation Australia (FFA) member federation teams determined through individual state-based preliminary rounds. 2015 marks the first season in which teams from all nine FFA member federations participate, with the Northern Territory participating for the first time.

Football Federation Australia announced in February 2015 that most of the games from the round of 32 onwards would be played on a Tuesday or Wednesday, with the final held on Saturday 7 November.

The winner of the FFA Cup, Melbourne Victory, received $50,000 as part of a total prize money pool of $131,000. The defending champions, Adelaide United, were knocked out in the Quarter-final stage of the competition.

Round and dates

Prize fund

In addition, a further $2,500 was donated from sponsor NAB to Member Federation clubs for each goal scored by them against an A-League opposition. Three clubs received donations – Rockdale City Suns ($5,000), Darwin Olympic ($2,500) and Edgeworth FC ($2,500).

Preliminary rounds

FFA member federations teams competed in various state-based preliminary rounds to win one of 21 places in the competition proper (round of 32). All Australian clubs were eligible to enter the qualifying process through their respective FFA member federation; however, only one team per club was permitted entry in the competition. All nine FFA member federations took part in the tournament, with the Northern Territory participating for the first time. Player registration numbers in each jurisdiction were used to determine the number of qualifying teams for each member federation:
 NSW had five teams qualify.
 Queensland have four teams qualify.
 Victoria have four teams qualify.
 Northern NSW have two teams qualify.
 Western Australia have two teams qualify.
 ACT have one team qualify.
 Northern Territory have one team qualify.
 South Australia have one team qualify.
 Tasmania have one team qualify.

Unlike the previous season, this competition's preliminary rounds operated within a consistent national structure whereby club entry into the competition were staggered in each state or territory, ultimately leading to a seventh and final round, with the winning clubs from that round gaining direct entry into the round of 32. The first matches of the preliminary rounds began on 14 February 2015, and the final matches of the preliminary rounds took place on 28 June 2015.

Teams
A total of 32 teams participated in the 2015 FFA Cup competition proper, ten of which came from the A-League, one the 2014 National Premier Leagues Champion (North Eastern MetroStars from South Australia), and the remaining 21 teams from FFA member federations, as determined by the preliminary rounds. A-League clubs represent the highest level in the Australian league system, whereas member federation clubs come from Level 2 and below. The current season tier of member federation clubs is shown in parentheses.

Draw
As with the previous season, teams were allocated into one of three pots for the FFA Cup Round of 32 draw. Pot A included the four A-League teams to reach the semi-finals of the 2014–15 A-League finals series (Melbourne Victory, Sydney FC, Adelaide United and Melbourne City), Pot B included the remaining six A-League teams, and Pot C contained the 2014 National Premier Leagues Champion and the 21 member federation teams which qualified via the preliminary rounds. Teams were drawn randomly into pre-determined positions. For the round of 16, Quarter-finals and Semi-finals, teams were allocated into two pots: The remaining A-League teams  into one pot, and the remaining member federation teams into the other. In each draw, teams were drawn randomly into pre-determined positions.

Bracket

Round of 32
The Round of 32 draw took place on 1 July 2015. The lowest ranked side that qualified for this round were the Balmain Tigers. They were the only level 4 team left in the competition.

All times listed below are at AEST

Round of 16
The Round of 16 draw took place on 12 August 2015. The lowest ranked side that qualified for this round were the Queensland Lions. They were the only level 3 team left in the competition.

All times listed below are at AEST

Quarter-finals
The Quarter-final draw took place on 1 September.  The lowest ranked sides that qualified for this round were Heidelberg United, Hume City and Oakleigh Cannons. They were the only level 2 teams left in the competition.

All times listed below are at AEST

Semi-finals
The Semi-final draw took place on 29 September. The lowest ranked side that qualified for this round was Hume City, who were the only level 2 team left in the competition.

All times listed below are at AEDT

Final

All times listed below are at AEDT

Top goalscorers

FFA Cup All-Star Team

Source:

Broadcasting rights
The live television rights for the competition were held by the subscription network Fox Sports, who broadcast 11 games live, with live updates and crosses from a single camera at the concurrent matches for goals and highlights. Games not broadcast on Fox Sports were streamed live via their online services.  These matches were televised live by Fox Sports:

References

External links
 Official website

FFA Cup
FFA Cup
Australia Cup seasons